A multiphasic liquid  is a mixture consisting of more than two immiscible liquid phases. Biphasic mixtures consisting of two immiscible phases are very common and usually consist of an organic solvent and an aqueous phase ("oil and water").

Multiphasic liquids can be used for selective liquid-liquid extractions or for decorative purposes, e.g. in cosmetics.

While it is possible to get multilayered phases by layering nonpolar and aqueous phases of decreasing densities on top of each other, these phases will not separate after mixing like true multiphasic liquids.

Compositions 

The following types of multiphasic liquids exist:

Triphasic systems 

 Nonpolar solvent / aqueous biphasic mixture
 e.g. using hexane, heptane, cyclohexane, or mineral oil as the nonpolar solvent
 Nonpolar solvent / polar solvent / salt / water
 e.g. 100 ml mineral oil, 100 ml isopropanol, 75 ml water, 35 g calcium chloride
 Nonpolar solvent / water-soluble polymer A, water-soluble polymer B, water
 e.g. hexane, polyethylene oxide, dextran, water
 Nonpolar solvent / water-soluble polymer / salt / water
 e.g. hexane, polyethylene oxide, sodium sulfate, water
 Nonpolar solvent A / solvent B / polymer soluble in solvent B and water / water
 e.g. heptane, dichloromethane, polyethylene oxide, water
 Nonpolar solvent A / solvent B / polymer soluble in solvent B and water / salt / water
 e.g. 16.3% heptane, 21.7% dichloromethane, 9.5% polyethylene oxide, 51.5% water, 0.1% sodium sulfate
 Nonpolar solvent / hydrophobic salt / water
 e.g. iso-octane, Aliquat 336 (methyltrioctylammonium chloride, a phase transfer catalyst), water 
 or:  cyclohexane, bmim-PF6 (an ionic liquid), water 
 Hydrophobic ionic liquid – water – hydrocarbon systems
 e.g. 1-butyl-3-methylimidazolium hexafluorophosphate – water – cyclohexane

Tetraphasic systems 

 Nonpolar solvent A / solvent B / polymer soluble in solvent B and water / salt / water
 e.g. 10.9% heptane, 15.5% dichloromethane, 7.1% polyethylene oxide, 66.5% sodium sulfate (> 0.1%) in water
 Nonpolar solvent / Polar solvent / salt / water / Fluorinated solvent
 e.g. Hexane, isopropanol, brine, perfluoromethylcyclohexane
Non polar solvent / Aprotic polar solvent / Water / Fluorinated solvent
 e.g. Octane, 5-methyl-1,3-dioxolane-4-one, water, perfluorodecaline

Higher order multiphasic systems 
A system with eight phases is known. In addition to a hydrocarbon and an aqueous phase, it includes a silicone oil, an aniline and a fluorous phase, and molten phosphorus, gallium and mercury.

See also 

 Separating funnel

References

External links 

 Chem. Commun. 1998, 787 Polymer induced multiphase generation in water/organic solvent mixtures. Strategies towards the design of triphasic and tetraphasic liquid systems (pdf)
 US patent application 20050215443 Multiphase aqueous cleansing composition
 (Movie) Oil and water separation by molecular dynamics simulation

Heterogeneous chemical mixtures